Kai Lindberg (December 10, 1899 – May 27, 1985) was a Danish politician. He served as the second Minister for Greenland from 1957 to 1960, and also the Minister of Transport and Public Works. He was a Social Democrat.

References

1899 births
1985 deaths
Social Democrats (Denmark) politicians
Transport ministers of Denmark